Montrichard Val de Cher or Montrichard-Val-de-Cher, is a commune in the Loir-et-Cher department in the Centre-Val de Loire region, France. The municipality was established on 1 January 2016 by merger of the former communes of Montrichard and Bourré.

See also 
Communes of the Loir-et-Cher department

References 

Communes of Loir-et-Cher
Touraine